Mount Jukes is a mountain located on the Jukes Range, a spur off the West Coast Range, in the West Coast region of Tasmania, Australia.

The mountain was named by Charles Gould in 1862 in honour of Professor Joseph Jukes, an English geologist who gathered evidence to part afforded support for Charles Darwin's theories of coral reefs.

Mines
It has had mines and small mining camps adjacent to the lakes, and on the northern upper slopes, near where the Mount Jukes road traverses the upper slopes of the King River Gorge. These mines provide resources to nearby areas and give power to the surrounding areas.

Access and features
The Mount Jukes Road  ( in length) was constructed by the Hydro in the 1980s at the time the Crotty Dam was made. It connects southern Queenstown with Darwin Dam, where the previously utilised North Mount Lyell Railway formation between the Linda Valley and Crotty was submerged by Lake Burbury.

Two named glacial lakes in the upper part of the eastern side of the mountain are the Upper Lake Jukes and the Lower Lake Jukes. It is by the lakes that a number of small mines were started in the early years of the twentieth century.

Mount Huxley is located to the north and Mount Darwin is located to the south.

Peaks and spurs
Mount Jukes has a number of named features: 
 Jukes Rangethe ridge between Proprietary Peak in the north, and South Jukes Peak
 Mount Jukes
 Proprietary Peak, north west of main part of Mount Jukes, with the Crown Spur the most noticeable feature when viewed from the town of Queenstown to the north.
 Pyramid Peak
 West Jukes Peak
 South Jukes Peak
 East Jukes Peak, closest to King River Gorge and the Crotty Dam, and to the north of the Mount Jukes Road.
 Central Peak

Some other named features include Yellow Knob, Yellow Knob Spur, South Jukes Spur, Crown Spur, East Jukes Spur, Intercolonial Spur, Cliff Spur, and Newall Spur.

See also

 List of highest mountains of Tasmania

References

Further reading
 
 
 

Jukes, Mount
Jukes, Mount
King River power development scheme